The Attorney General of Kenya is the head of the Kenyan State Law Office, the principal legal adviser to the government of Kenya, and an ex officio member of Parliament and the Cabinet. Justin Muturi, the current attorney general, was nominated by President William Ruto in October 2022. His nomination was approved by the National Assembly on 26 October 2022, after the requisite vetting process.

History 
The Office of the Attorney General draws its mandate from Article 156 of the 2010 Constitution of Kenya, which vests in the Attorney General the responsibility of being the principal legal adviser to the government to ensure that the rule of law is promoted, protected and upheld, and defend the public interest. The Office of the Attorney General Act No. 49 of 2012 spells out the functions of the office, which include:

Duties
The attorney general's duties include the formulation of legal policy and ensuring proper administration of Kenya's legal system, including professional legal education. Assisting the Attorney General in the performance of his duties as principal legal adviser to the government are:
 Solicitor General
 Senior Deputy Solicitor General
 Director of Public Prosecutions
 Registrar General
 Administrator General
 Chairman of Advocates Complaints Commission
 Chief Parliamentary Counsel
 Chief State Counsel

Attorneys General of East Africa Protectorate (1895–1920)

 Alfred Karney Young (1906–1909)
 Ralph Molyneux Combe (1912–1914)
 Sir Jacob William Barth (1914–1918)
 Ivan Llewelyn Owen Gower (1918, acting)
 Robert William Lyall-Grant (1918–1920)

Attorneys General of British Kenya (1920–1963)
 Robert William Lyall-Grant (1920–1925)
 Ivan Llewelyn Owen Gower (1925–1926) (acting)
 Sir Walter Huggard (1926–1929)
 Sir Alisdair Duncan Atholl MacGregor (1929–1934)
 Walter Harragin (1933–1941)
 Sir Stafford W.P. Foster Sutton (1944–1948)
 Sir Kenneth O'Connor (1948– )
 John Whyatt (1951–1955)
 Sir Eric Newton Griffiths-Jones (1955– )
 Diarmaid William Conroy ( –1960) (acting)
 Sir Eric Newton Griffiths-Jones (1960–1963)

Attorneys General of Kenya (since 1963)
 Charles Mugane Njonjo (1963–1979)
 James B. Karugu (1980–1981) 
 Joseph Kamere (1981–1983)
 Matthew Guy Muli (1983–1991)
 Amos Wako (1991–2011) 
 Githu Muigai (2011–2018)
 Paul Kihara Kariuki (2018–2022)
 Justin Muturi (2022–present)

==References==

External links
 

Government agencies of Kenya

Judiciary of Kenya
List